Millettia semsei is a species of legume in the family Fabaceae.
It is found only in Tanzania.

Sources
 

semsei
Flora of Tanzania
Vulnerable plants
Taxonomy articles created by Polbot
Taxobox binomials not recognized by IUCN